Esther Newberg, originally from Middletown, Connecticut, is an American literary agent and former aide to Senator Robert F. Kennedy during his 1968 presidential campaign.

Political career
Newberg attended Wheaton College, and joined Senator Robert F. Kennedy's staff in 1968. She was also a member of the presidential campaign staffs of Senator Edmund Muskie and Representative Mo Udall. She was one of the six "Boiler Room Girls" who socialized with Ted Kennedy and several others, on the evening of Mary Jo Kopechne's death.

Literary agent
Newberg is the senior vice president at International Creative Management, a talent agency in New York City. She has represented authors such as Carl Hiaasen (Skinny Dip) and Robert Iger (Trace), Thomas Friedman, Michael Beschloss, Don Imus, Tom Hanks, Ina Garten, Chris Rock and Caroline Kennedy.  The New York Post called her "one of the most powerful agents in the literary world."

References

Living people
People from Middletown, Connecticut
Literary agents
Wheaton College (Massachusetts) alumni
United States congressional aides
Year of birth missing (living people)